Toolern Vale is a town in Victoria, Australia,  north-west of Melbourne's Central Business District, located within the City of Melton and the Shire of Macedon Ranges local government areas.

Toolern Vale contains a primary school, a CFA fire station, a war memorial and reserve with tennis courts, as well as a community hall often used for antique and collectables auctions.

Toolern Vale is renowned for the numerous horse studs, stables and training facilities which abound. Because of this, the area is often referred to as "Thoroughbred Country". VicRoads has issued special, gold and brown "Thoroughbred Country" licence plates which are often seen being spotted on vehicles from Toolern Vale.

The Post Office opened on 1 January 1871 and was known as Toolern until 1904.

Melton Airfield

Melton Airfield is a small grass strip airfield located at the intersection of Coburns Road and Diggers Rest - Coimadai Road.

Gallery

References

External links

Emirates Park Stud
Plane Spotting in Victoria

Towns in Victoria (Australia)
City of Melton